Argos Energies ltd is an independent oil company with headquarters in Rotterdam, Netherlands. The company is active in the Netherlands, Belgium, Luxembourg, Germany and France.

Argos Oil was founded in 1983 by their CEO Peter Goedvolk. Argos Oil merged with North Sea Group on 25 October 2011, and in March 2012 the merged company was renamed Argos North Sea Group. Since 2012, the company has been the principal sponsor of Argos-Shimano, a professional cycling team based in the Netherlands.

In 2015, Argos merged with Varo Energy, a company associated with Vitol.

References

External links
Argos Oil

Oil companies of the Netherlands
Automotive fuel retailers